Crinopseudoa is a genus of West African corinnid sac spiders first described by Rudy Jocqué & J. Bosselaers in 2011.

Species
 it contains eleven species from Guinea and Liberia:
Crinopseudoa billeni Jocqué & Bosselaers, 2011 – Guinea
Crinopseudoa bong Jocqué & Bosselaers, 2011 (type) – Liberia
Crinopseudoa bongella Jocqué & Bosselaers, 2011 – Liberia
Crinopseudoa caligula Jocqué & Bosselaers, 2011 – Liberia
Crinopseudoa catharinae Jocqué & Bosselaers, 2011 – Guinea, Liberia
Crinopseudoa ephialtes Jocqué & Bosselaers, 2011 – Guinea
Crinopseudoa flomoi Jocqué & Bosselaers, 2011 – Liberia
Crinopseudoa leiothorax Jocqué & Bosselaers, 2011 – Guinea
Crinopseudoa otus Jocqué & Bosselaers, 2011 – Guinea
Crinopseudoa paucigranulata Jocqué & Bosselaers, 2011 – Guinea
Crinopseudoa titan Jocqué & Bosselaers, 2011 – Guinea

References

Araneomorphae genera
Corinnidae
Spiders of Africa